Naitaba Island (Naitauba, Naitaba)  is an island of the northern Lau Islands of Fiji. The island is forested and coconuts were grown commercially for copra. There is a barrier reef completely surrounding the island.

History
In 1965 the actor Raymond Burr and his partner purchased  on the island, where they raised copra and cattle. This land was sold in 1983 to Johannine Daist Communion for the use of Adi Da, with a purchase price of $2.1 million.

References

Islands of Fiji
Lau Islands